Pat Hirst (18 November 1918 – January 1996) was a British gymnast. She competed at the 1948 Summer Olympics, the 1952 Summer Olympics and the 1956 Summer Olympics.

References

1918 births
1996 deaths
British female artistic gymnasts
Olympic gymnasts of Great Britain
Gymnasts at the 1948 Summer Olympics
Gymnasts at the 1952 Summer Olympics
Gymnasts at the 1956 Summer Olympics
Place of birth missing
20th-century British women